Rodelo is a surname. Notable people with the surname include:

Rosa Valenzuela Rodelo, Mexican politician
Sigfrido Cuen Rodelo (born 1953), Mexican engineer, philanthropist, and former businessman

See also
Rodello